is a railway station located in Nagaokakyō, Kyoto Prefecture, Japan. It serves the JR Kyoto Line (Tōkaidō Main Line) of West Japan Railway Company. The distances to major stations are 10.1 km to Kyoto Station, 32.7 km to Osaka Station and 523.7 km to Tokyo Station.

Nagaokakyō Station is one of the two railway stations in the city of Nagaokakyō. The other is Nagaoka-Tenjin Station on the Hankyu Kyoto Line.

Trains 
Local trains (including rapid service trains after the morning) and rapid service trains (in the morning) of the JR Kyoto Line stop at the station.

Station facilities 
Nagaokakyō Station has two island platforms. Stairs, escalators and elevators connect the two platforms to the upper level concourse. The station provides automated and window services for passengers including seat reservation. Tracks No. 1 and 4 are fenced as all trains on the outer tracks pass through this station without stopping.

History 
The station was named after the village (Shin-Kōtari). On 1 September 1995, the station was renamed Nagaokakyō, the present city name.

Station numbering was introduced to the station in March 2018 with Nagaokakyō being assigned station number JR-A35.

Environs 
The headquarters of Murata Manufacturing are just east of the station. Nagaoka-Tenjin Station of Hankyu Kyoto Line is located about 1 km west of the station.

In front of the east exit of the station, a miniature of bullet-marked chimney is standing. This is a monument of an attack by an enemy carrier-based aircraft to Kōtari area on July 19, 1945, which killed one and injured some.

Adjacent stations

References

External links 
Nagaokakyō Station (JR West official site) 

Railway stations in Japan opened in 1931
Railway stations in Kyoto Prefecture
Tōkaidō Main Line